The sub-provinces of the Philippines were a political and administrative division of the Philippines. The sub-provinces were a part of a larger "regular" province and residents of a sub-province participated in provincial elections of the parent province.

List of historical sub-provinces

References

Former subdivisions of the Philippines